Crinodessus amyae is a species of beetle in the family Dytiscidae, the only known species in the genus Crinodessus.

References

Dytiscidae genera
Monotypic Adephaga genera